The Best of Guitar Shorty is the first true compilation album released by blues guitarist Guitar Shorty; 1996's Billie Jean Blues was more of a live album. The album was released on June 20, 2006 on CD by the label Shout! Factory. The album comprises tracks from My Way or the Highway (1991), Topsy Turvy (1993), Get Wise to Yourself (1995), and Roll Over, Baby (1998).

Track listing
 "Go Wild!" (Jackson, Rhodes, Wolf) — 3:05
 "You Better Get Wise to Yourself" (Jones, Swamp Dogg) — 5:35
 "I Want to Report a Crime" (Williams) — 4:08
 "Hard to Stay Above the Ground" (Kearney, Scott) — 5:43
 "Hard Life" (Kearney) — 5:19
 "I'm So Glad I Met You" (Fran, Kearney) — 4:17
 "Maybe She'll Miss Me" (Barnhill, Rice) — 4:30
 "I'm the Clean Up Man" — 3:46
 "The Bottom Line" — 3:53
 "No Educated Woman" — 6:05
 "I Wonder Who's Sleeping in My Bed" — 7:06
 "Red Hot Mama" — 3:25
 "Mean Husband Blues" — 3:56
 "Hey Joe" (Roberts) — 7:07

Personnel
 Guitar Shorty — guitar, vocals
 Howard Deere, Glenn Letsch, Dan Quinton, Lee Allen Zeno — bass
 Otis Grand, Chris Hayes, Clarence Hollimon — guitar
 Herman V. Ernest III, Shannon Powell, Danny Pucillo Quartet, Daniel Strittmatter — drums, percussion
 Riley Osborne — piano
 Tony Ashton, Sammy Berfect, Jim Pugh, Dwayne Smith, David Torkanowsky — organ
 Peter Beck, Ward Smith, Ernest Youngblood Jr. — saxophone (alto, tenor)
 Carol Fran, Charles Elam III, Phillip Manuel — vocals
 Mike Hobart, Mark "Kaz" Kazanoff — saxophone (baritone)
 Michael Mordecai, Mark Mullins, Rick Trolsen — trombones
 Jamil Sharif, Gary Slechta, Keith Winking — trumpets

Production:
 Bill Dahl — liner notes
 Derek Dressler — compilation producer
 James Fraher — cover photo
 Emily Johnson — artwork, package supervision
 Jeff Palo — producer
 Randy Perry — remastering
 Julee Stover — editorial supervision

Reception

AllMusic stated that "Guitar Shorty on disc is a poor substitute, but he still generates tremendous energy." Reviewer Steve Leggett comments that "Shorty is a guitar player's guitar player, and this collection makes for a nice introduction to his studio style."

References

2006 compilation albums
Guitar Shorty albums
Blues compilation albums